A month of bugs is a strategy used by security researchers to draw attention to the lax security procedures of commercial software corporations.

Researchers have started such a project for software products where they believe corporations have shown themselves to be unresponsive and uncooperative to security alerts. Responsible disclosure is not working properly, and then find and disclose one security vulnerability each day for one month.

Examples
The original "Month of Bugs" was the Month of Browser Bugs (MoBB) run by security researcher HD Moore.

Subsequent similar projects include:

 The Month of Kernel Bugs (MoKB) which published kernel bugs for Mac OS X, Linux, FreeBSD, Solaris and Windows, as well as four wireless driver bugs. 
 The Month of Apple Bugs (MoAB) conducted by researchers Kevin Finisterre and LMH which published bugs related to Mac OS X.
 The Month of PHP Bugs sponsored by the Hardened PHP team which published 44 PHP bugs.

See also
 Fuzz testing
 Metasploit Project
 Vulnerability disclosure

References

Further reading

External links
 Month of Kernel Bugs (MoKB) archive
 Kernel Fun: Month of the Kernel Bugs blog
 Month of Apple Bugs (MoAB) archive
 Apple Fun: Month of the Apple Buggs blog
 Info-pull.com blog: A complementary blog from the hosts of MoKB and MoAB
 The Month of PHP Security

Security compliance
Software testing